Holland Historic District is a national historic district located at Suffolk, Virginia. The district encompasses 106 contributing buildings and 1 contributing site in the crossroads community of Holland in Suffolk.  The district includes a variety of turn-of-the-20th century residential styles, a smaller number of brick commercial structures, several industrial buildings along the railroad, and two churches. Most of the buildings in Holland were built after 1910.  Notable buildings include Dr. Job Holland Building, the former Bank of Holland, the railroad depot, Holland Christian Church (1918), Holland Baptist Church (1922), and the William T. Holland farmhouse (1860-1880).

It was added to the National Register of Historic Places in 1983.

References

Historic districts on the National Register of Historic Places in Virginia
Buildings and structures in Suffolk, Virginia
National Register of Historic Places in Suffolk, Virginia